Daveluyville is a city in the Centre-du-Québec region of the Canadian province of Quebec. It was founded by Adolphe Daveluy, the grandfather of organist Raymond Daveluy and soprano Marie Daveluy. It is north of Autoroute 20. Its population was 2,360 in the Canada 2021 Census.

Demographics 

External links
Daveluyville Website

References

Cities and towns in Quebec
Incorporated places in Centre-du-Québec